Czech Republic competed at the 2020 Winter Youth Olympics in Lausanne, Switzerland from 9 to 22 January 2020.

Medalists
Medals awarded to participants of mixed-NOC teams are represented in italics. These medals are not counted towards the individual NOC medal tally.

Alpine skiing

Boys

Girls

Biathlon

Boys

Girls

Mixed

Cross-country skiing 

Boys

Girls

Curling

Czech Republic qualified a mixed team of four athletes.
Mixed team

Mixed doubles

Figure skating

One male figure skaters achieved quota places for Czech Republic based on the results of the 2019 World Junior Figure Skating Championships.

Singles

Couples

Freestyle skiing 

Ski cross

Slopestyle & Big Air

Ice hockey

Girls' tournament 

Summary

Luge

Boys

Girls

Nordic combined 

Individual

Nordic mixed team

Short track speed skating

One female skaters achieved quota places for Czech Republic based on the results of the 2019 World Junior Short Track Speed Skating Championships.

Girls

Skeleton

Ski jumping

Boys

Girls

Snowboarding

Snowboard cross

Halfpipe, Slopestyle, & Big Air

Speed skating

Boys

Girls

Mass Start

Mixed

See also
Czech Republic at the 2020 Summer Olympics

References

2020 in Czech sport
Nations at the 2020 Winter Youth Olympics
Czech Republic at the Youth Olympics